François-Marie-Benjamin Richard de la Vergne (1 March 1819 – 27 January 1908) was a French cardinal of the Roman Catholic Church and served as the Archbishop of Paris.

His cause of canonization has commenced and he has the title of Servant of God.

Biography

Early life and priesthood
François-Marie-Benjamin Richard was born in 1819 in Nantes and was one of eleven children.

Richard was educated at the seminary of St Sulpice where he studied theology from October 1841. He was ordained to the priesthood on 21 December 1844 by the Archbishop of Paris Denis Auguste Affre. He served as a parish priest from 1845 to 1846 before he was sent to Rome for further studies that spanned from 1846 to 1849. He was later made the Vicar-General of Nantes on 1 August 1850 and occupied that post until 1869.

Episcopate
Pope Pius IX appointed Richard as the Bishop of Belley on 22 December 1871. He received episcopal consecration on 11 February 1872 in Paris. Later, in 1875, he was appointed Titular Archbishop of Larissa and Coadjutor of Paris. In 1886 the death of Cardinal Guibert was followed by Richard's succession to the see of Paris.

Cardinalate and death

Pope Leo XIII elevated him into the cardinalate on 24 May 1889 as the Cardinal-Priest of Santa Maria in Via.

In January 1900 the trial of the Assumptionist Fathers resulted in the dissolution of their society as an illegal association. The next day an official visit of the archbishop to the fathers was noted by the government as an act of a political character and Richard was officially censured. His attitude was in general exceedingly moderate, he had no share in the extremist policy of the Ultramontanes, and throughout the struggle over the law of Associations and the law of Separations he maintained his reasonable temper.

Richard participated in the papal conclave of 1903 that saw the election of Pope Pius X.

He presided in September 1906 over an assembly of bishops and archbishops at his palace in the rue de Grenelle, a few days after the papal encyclical forbidding French Catholics to form associations for public worship, but it was then too late for conciliation. In December he gave up the archiepiscopal palace to the government authorities. He was then an old man of nearly ninety, and his eviction evoked great sympathy.

Richard died in 1908 of congestion of the lungs and was buried in the cathedral of Notre Dame.

References

External links

1819 births
1908 deaths
Clergy from Nantes
Bishops of Belley
Archbishops of Paris
20th-century French cardinals
Cardinals created by Pope Leo XIII
19th-century French cardinals
20th-century venerated Christians
French Servants of God
Bishops appointed by Pope Pius IX